Bhagsu/Bhaksu (also known as Bhagsunag or Bhagsunath) is a village near McLeod Ganj in Dharamshala, in the Kangra district of Himachal Pradesh, India. The village is the site of Bhagsunag waterfall and the ancient Bhagsunag Temple.

In early 18th century, the Gorkhas came here with British to settle and they formed the 1st Gorkha Rifles in 1815 (The Malaun Regiment). Bhagsu is also the home of 1st Gorkha Rifles (The Malaun Regiment). Bhagsu is named after the Bhagsunag temple  currently in McLeodGanj station.

History 
In Indian mythology, the snake god, Nagdevata, got into a battle with King Bhagsu, who had stolen water from the sacred NagDal Lake. King Bhagsu was defeated and eventually forgiven, and the site was consecrated as Bhagsu Nag.

Tourism 
There are a number of hotels in Bhagsu. Tourist attractions include Bhagsu Waterfall, the Triund Trek, and Dharamkot.

References 

Tourism in Himachal Pradesh
Dharamshala